Ho Chong, Huh Chung, or Heo Jeong (April 8, 1896September 18, 1988) was a South Korean politician and Korean independence activist, who served as the sixth Prime Minister of South Korea during the country's Second Republic.

In 1960, he was an acting prime minister during the First South Korean Republic. In addition, he headed a caretaker government for a brief time following the 1960 April Revolution which overthrew the First Republic. Ho was also known by the nickname, "Uyang" (literally "friend of the seas"), and an alternative name, Heo Sung-su.

Career
Ho Chong was born in Busan, South Gyeongsang province. His father, Ho Mun-il, was a wealthy merchant. In 1922, Ho went into political asylum, where he lent a hand to Syngman Rhee. From 1922 to 1936, Ho participated in Korean resistance movements. On September 2, 1945, he joined the Korea Democratic Party. In 1950, he was appointed to Acting Prime Minister and later in 1951, additionally was Minister of Health until 1952. From 1957 to 1959 he was appointed as Mayor of Seoul and was later dispatched to Japan as the South Korean special envoy to Japan. On April 16, he became Foreign Minister. On April 25, he was appointed Acting Prime Minister, and the following day President Syngman Rhee resigned. Ho Chong was additionally Acting President until August 18 of that year. On July 16, 1960, he was appointed as the 6th Prime Minister of South Korea, by the National Assembly. He remained Acting President of South Korea until succeeded by Yun Bo-seon on his election.

In 1919, he met Syngman Rhee in a Methodist church of Seoul. Since then and until 1960, Ho Chong was Syngman Rhee's enthusiastic follower.

Bibliography
 For After Day's Testimony (《내일을 위한 증언》; SaemTer, 1979)

See also 
 April 19 Movement
 Politics of South Korea
 History of South Korea
 Syngman Rhee

References

Site link 
 Heo Jeong 

1896 births
1988 deaths
People from Busan
Korean independence activists
Government ministers of South Korea
Korea University alumni
South Korean anti-communists
South Korean Methodists
Mayors of Seoul
Democratic Party (South Korea, 1955) politicians
Liberal Party (South Korea) politicians
South Korean journalists
Korean nationalists
Members of the National Assembly (South Korea)
Foreign ministers of South Korea
Acting presidents of South Korea
Gimhae Heo clan
20th-century journalists